The Pinehill Inn, or just Pinehill, is a National Register of Historic Places listed house in the Ogle County, Illinois county seat of Oregon. Pinehill joined the Register in July 1978.

Architecture
Pinehill was built in 1874 by William Judd Mix. The brick, wood and limestone structure stands on five acres of land and is cast in the Italianate style of architecture.

Significance
Pinehill was listed on the National Register of Historic Places on September 1, 1977, for its significance in the area of architecture.

Notes

External links

Pinehill Inn, official site, accessed January 22, 2011.

National Register of Historic Places in Ogle County, Illinois
Oregon, Illinois
Houses in Ogle County, Illinois
Houses on the National Register of Historic Places in Illinois